Bheems Ceciroleo is an Indian music composer, lyricist, singer, and director who is best known for his works in Telugu cinema. 

Bheems is best known for his compositions which resemble cultural folklore, as a genre. He wrote lyrics for a single "Yellipothavura Manishi" sung by a versatile Telugu singer Nagole Swathi Reddy  from United Kingdom (Folk / Western / Devotional Singer / Anchor). He wrote this musical track about then current economic, social and environmental issues during the COVID-19 pandemic (August 2020). As said by the singer herself - this track was written as a humble homage to mother nature and humanity. He became an overnight sensation as a lyricist with "Oye Raju" from the film Aayudham. 

Some of Bheems' most notable works in the Telugu Film Industry include Bengal Tiger, Garuda Vega and most recently, Dhamaka and Balagam[2023], for which he earned critical acclaim.

Early life
Bheems Ceciroleo was born in Garla Bayyaram in the then Khammam district of Telangana state, into a primarily agricultural family, where he completed his schooling. His last name, 'Ceciroleo' was added by his father, given his keen interest in science and philosophy, specifically in the works of Cicero and Galileo. 

While in his early teens, Bheems was a keen observant of social movements in his hometown, which he says, is what first inspired him to make music. In his eighth standard, Bheems began writing and composing songs. Most of his writings were based on nature and other contemporary themes. He participated in multiple music competitions, in which he would render his own compositions.

Years later, when Bheems was pursuing his degree in Khammam, he obtained the opportunity to participate in a singing competition, hosted by a TV channel in Warangal. He then left for Hyderabad in 2002, in pursuit of opportunities to compose music for Telugu cinema, driven by a suggestion he was given, while in the competition, to try doing so.

Career

Early Attempts 
In early 2002, Bheems, who landed in Hyderabad with the idea of reaching out to directors and producers of Telugu cinema to present his work and try bagging opportunities to compose for the same, first decided to approach the Telugu film director Teja, as he believed Teja was someone who always had doors open to new-comers. Though he was not able to approach director Teja, he succeeded in presenting his work to one of his Assistant Directors, Suryanarayana Raju, who appreciated his work, and helped him reach out to one of his close associates, who would later help Bheems reach out to Telugu film director N. Shankar, who was then, working on the film Aayudham. 

Telugu film director N. Shankar appreciated Bheems' work, and got in touch with him six months later, in 2003, when Bheems' learnt that the composer of the film, Aayudham was Vandemataram Srinivas, whom Bheems was able to meet, and when asked to present his work, Bheems sang "Oye Raju Kannullo", which was captivating to the director and the composer of the film, who had initially decided to get the track re-written by Veturi Sundara Ramamurthy for the film version, an opportunity that was later given to Bheems himself. The track went on to become a chartbuster from the album.

Following Opportunities and a Brief Setback 
With the recognition Bheems had earned from "Oye Raju Kannullo" from Aayudham, Bheems believed the acclaim he had received for this track would pave way for more opportunities of composing film music. However, this did not go as expected, as Bheems continued to approach producers and directors for the same, which unfortunately, had not converted into working opportunities.

While working for Aayudham, Bheems befriended director Sampath Nandi, who worked as the dialogue writer of this film, as both would have conversations on creative inputs for the film in terms of dialogue placement, music and other suggestions. Subsequently, Bheems was given the opportunity to compose music for the first film directed by Sampath Nandi, Emaindi Ee Vela, but was later, taken off, due to unforeseen circumstances. He also helped Sampath with similar inputs with one of his next films, Racha, which, however, did not convert into a working opportunity.

Following a series of iterations with film directors and producers which hadn't worked out and the aforementioned setbacks, owing to family circumstances, Bheems decided to move on from cinema, and went on to get a B.Ed degree from a college in Rajahmundry, after which he worked as a teacher of Social Studies, following which, he also pursued a M.A in English from Kakatiya University.

2012-2017: Return To Film Music And Rise 
While on the project Emaindi Ee Vela, the Executive Producer of the film, M.S. Kumar, who had listened to Bheems' work, also happened to be the Executive Producer of the film Nuvva Nena, which he got Bheems to compose music for. The track Vayyaari Blackberry Phonule from this albm, which released in 2012, turned out to be popular among the masses, especially, the youth.

Following this, Bheems' was able to bag similar opportunities with movies Kevvu Keka, Joru, and Ala Ela between 2013 and 2015. The track Babu O Rambabu from the album Kevvu Keka that released in 2013 was a popular hit. 

Soon, Bheems got to work on one of the biggest albums of his career, for the movie Bengal Tiger, directed by Sampath Nandi, his friend, starring Ravi Teja. The album earned critical acclaim, with Ravi Teja too appreciating Bheems' work, who also gave him the opportunity to compose music for his next film, which was however, shelved later. However, with composer Mani Sharma having worked on the re-recording of the album of Bengal Tiger, Bheems believes the critical acclaim received from the audience for the album could be owned by none of the two.

A year later, Bheems composed the album of the film Nakshatram, which was the first film he also worked on the re-recording of.

2017-2022 
Bheems continued to work on albums of films such as PSV Garuda Vega, from which the track Deo Deo was a chartbuster. He also composed music for the films Paper Boy, Software Sudheer and a couple of more films. All of these albums fared well, but did not get Bheems the breakthrough and the subsequent accolades and recognition he had been striving to receive from the audience.

Later, in 2021, Ravi Teja, who immensely believed in the potential of Bheems, got him to compose music for his next film, Dhamaka. This album, which released in 2022, turned out to be a massive breakthrough in his career, with a large section of the masses getting to know him, by means of his compositions for the film Jinthaak, Dandakadiyal and more, which brought him into the spotlight, as most songs in the album were inspired by folklore, leading to its unique reception. The album of this film earned him widespread recognition, with the film too doing well at the box office.

Currently, Bheems is working on films lined up for release in 2023.

Discography

As composer

As lyricist

References 

Living people
Telugu people
Indian lyricists
Telugu-language lyricists
Telugu film score composers
Musicians from Rajasthan
People from Jalore district
Year of birth missing (living people)